Skytrak was a flying roller coaster located at Granada Studios Tour amusement park in Castlefield, Manchester, England. Opened in 1997, it was the first flying roller coaster in the world, in which riders were tilted forward to experience the sensation of flying. Issues with the ride delayed its opening by several months, and the park permanently closed at the end of the same season. The ride was eventually removed and scrapped.

References

External links
Remembered: Granada Studios Tour

Roller coasters in the United Kingdom